Milton L. Peach (born December 5, 1943) was a Canadian politician. He represented the electoral district of Carbonear in the Newfoundland and Labrador House of Assembly from 1982 to 1989. He was a member of the Progressive Conservative Party of Newfoundland and Labrador. He was born at Carbonear. He holds B.A. and B.Ed. degrees and was a teacher.

References

1943 births
Living people
Progressive Conservative Party of Newfoundland and Labrador MHAs